The 2010 ITM Hamilton 400 was the fourth event of the 2010 V8 Supercar Championship Series and the third running of the Hamilton 400. It was held on the weekend of 16–18 April on the inner city streets of Hamilton, in New Zealand.

Report

Race 7
An even start saw pole sitter Jamie Whincup take the lead from Garth Tander at the first corner ahead of Michael Caruso, Craig Lowndes, Tony D'Alberto as Holdens dominated the start. Steven Johnson was the first Ford ahead of Rick Kelly, Fabian Coulthard, James Courtney and Mark Winterbottom. Yellows were waved on the opening lap after Shane van Gisbergen hit the wall over the back section of the circuit with both Russell Ingall and Dean Fiore striking glancing blows on the now limping Ford with Todd Kelly and Jason Bargwanna ending up spun backwards to the field in the ensuing chaos.

Tander forced his way into the lead in the early running, but once in front could not get away from Whincup. Light rain began in the opening laps, becoming more noticeable by about lap ten. A mechanical flag was waved at D'Alberto, ruining his best ever early race start, with flapping bodywork in the rear diffuser. Russell Ingall pitted on lap 12 with a misfire, diagnosed as a broken rocker. Cars began stopping for tyres on lap 16. Courtney the first of the leaders to pit along with Lee Holdsworth with Lowndes and Rick Kelly following on lap 17.

The round of pitstops completed saw Tander drop to third behind Whincup and Courtney. Daniel Gaunt hit the wall on lap 26 with Steven Richards pitting the following lap with mechanical issues. Both continued. After the second round of stops Tander settled back into second ahead of Courtney. Safety car was called for when Tim Slade stopped with his Ford unable to restart.

At the restart on lap 49 Whincup led from Tander, Courtney, Lowndes, Caruso, Steven Johnson, Mark Winterbottom, Rick Kelly and Paul Dumbrell. Fabian Coulthard turned Todd Kelly into a spin and Jonathon Webb also punting Greg Murphy into a spin. Alex Davison came to a halt with his portion of track blocked. All continued. Coulthard received a drive-through penalty. Top four pulled steadily away. Will Davison retired with an engine misfire after having climbed to the edge of the top ten after his qualifying accident left him buried in the grid.

Whincup pulled clear to claim his fifth race win of the year ahead of Tander, Courtney in the first Ford, Lowndes, Caruso, Johnson, Winterbottom, Rick Kelly, Dumbrell and Lee Holdsworth.

Race 8
Qualifying was marred by a heavy collision with a wall by Andrew Thompson, his second consecutive street circuit crash after damaging his car sufficiently at the 2010 Clipsal 500 to miss the entire meeting. The Walkinshaw Racing team assessed the damage as to extensive to repair for the race. Garth Tander secured pole position after a last minute effort by Race 7 polesitter Jamie Whincup fell afoul traffic. Behind Whincup was Michael Caruso in a strong performance in the Garry Rogers Motorsport Commodore with Rick Kelly and Craig Lowndes completing a clean sweep of the top five for Holden. First Fords were the Dick Johnson Racing pair of James Courtney and Steven Johnson in sixth and seventh with Will Davison, Rick Kelly and Mark Winterbottom completing the top ten positions. In a disappointing session for the strong New Zealand contingent Shane van Gisbergen represented their best in twelfth.

Results
Results as follows:

Qualifying Race 7
Qualifying timesheets:

Race 7
Race timesheets:

Qualifying Race 8
Qualifying timesheets:

Race 8
Race timesheets:

Standings
After race 8 of 26

Source

References

External links
Official timing and results
Hamilton 400 website

Hamilton
Hamilton 400
Hamilton 400
Motorsport in New Zealand
April 2010 sports events in New Zealand